The Battle of Knockavoe (Cnoc-Buidhbh) was fought in 1522 between the O'Donnells, led by Hugh Dubh O'Donnell and Manus O'Donnell, both sons of Sir Hugh Dubh O'Donnell, against the O'Neills, in which the O'Neills and their supporters were surprised and routed. Knockavoe was not a lost pitched battle, rather it was in fact the result of a nighttime surprise attack on the O'Neill camp by the O'Donnells.
Knockavoe is the hill just behind Strabane in County Tyrone.

Background
Conn Bacach O'Neill (who was later created Earl of Tyrone, in 1542) was determined to bring the O'Donnells under his rule and made a great gathering, determined to march into Tyrconnell. Forces arrived from Munster and Connacht, together with English contingents, and brought into O'Neill's army itself were the Scoto-Irish MacDonnells of Antrim, Bissetts, MacSheehys and others. The forces laid siege to and took Ballyshannon Castle, and later devastated a large part of Tyrconnell.

Battle
While encamped at Knockavoe, on the outskirts of Strabane, Conn O'Neill's forces were surprised at night by Hugh Dubh O'Donnell and Manus O'Donnell. Hugh and Manus led their small force quietly up to the campsite and launched a surprise attack before the sentinels were aware of how matters stood, with the two forces fighting furiously in pitch darkness in the midst of the camp. After a long and fearful struggle, in which men found it hard to distinguish friend from foe, the completely unprepared O'Neills and their supporters were routed with a loss of 900 men; and O'Donnell took possession of the camp, with an immense quantity of booty.

The full account of the battle is contained in The Annals of the Four Masters as follows:—

Notes:
Cnoc-Buidhbh, or the Hill of Bove Derg, is the old Gaelic name for Knockavoe.
Loch Monann was a lake that later burst out and formed Strabane Glen.
Druim-Lighean refers to Drumboy Hill, just beyond Lifford, on the Letterkenny Road.

Aftermath
The battle was one of the bloodiest ever fought between the O'Donnells and O'Neills, did not end the quarrel. Lord Kildare, who was Conn Bacach O'Neill's first cousin, tried to make peace; but in spite of his efforts the war continued for many years afterwards.

The only long-term result of Knockavoe did not involve the O'Donnells and O'Neills, but rather the MacDonnells and Bissetts. The last Mac Eoin Bissett, Lord of the Glens of Antrim, was slain in the battle, allowing the increasingly strong MacDonnells to seize the lordship from the weakened Bissetts and establish themselves as one of the most prominent families in Ulster.

See also
History of Ireland

References

Knockavoe
16th century in Ireland
Knockavoe
O'Donnell dynasty
O'Neill dynasty
Clan Donald
Clan Bissett